Audet is a surname. Notable people with the surname include:

 Antoine Audet, Canadian politician in Quebec, Canada
 Aurèle Audet (1920–2015), Canadian politician in Quebec, Canada 
 Consuelo Portela Audet (1885–1959), Cuban-born Spanish cuplé singer 
 Earl Audet (1921–2002), American football offensive lineman
 Jean-Paul Audet (1918–1993), French Canadian academic and philosopher
 Marie-Claude Audet (born 1962), Canadian cyclist
 Martine Audet (born 1961), Canadian poet
 Michel Audet (born 1940), Canadian economist and a politician in Quebec, Canada
 Nicodème Audet (1822–1905), merchant and political figure in Quebec
 Philippe Audet (born 1977), Canadian ice hockey player
 René Audet (1920–2011), Canadian Roman Catholic bishop
 Richard Joseph Audet (1922–1945), Canadian fighter pilot during World War II

See also
 Audit (disambiguation)
 Audette, surname